Mandibulata, termed "mandibulates", is a clade of arthropods that comprises the extant subphyla Myriapoda (millipedes and others), Crustacea and Hexapoda (insects and others). Mandibulata is currently believed to be the sister group of the clade Arachnomorpha, which comprises the rest of arthropods (Chelicerata and Trilobita). The mandibulates constitute the largest and most varied arthropod group.

The name "Mandibulata" refers to the mandibles or jaws, which are the characterizing feature of its member arthropods.

Molecular phylogenetic studies suggest that the living arthropods are related as shown in the cladogram below. Crustaceans do not form a monophyletic group as insects and other hexapods have evolved from within them.

See also
Atelocerata
Marrellomorpha
Myriochelata
Pancrustacea
Crustaceomorpha

References

Arthropod taxonomy